The 2016 Stetson Hatters football team represented Stetson University during the 2016 NCAA Division I FCS football season. They were led by fourth-year head coach Roger Hughes and played their home games at Spec Martin Stadium. They were members of the Pioneer Football League. They finished the season 4–7, 2–6 in PFL play to finish in a two-way tie for ninth place.

Schedule

Source: Schedule

Game summaries

Sacred Heart

Warner

Jacksonville

at Davidson

at Brown

Valparaiso

at Campbell

at Dayton

Marist

at San Diego

Drake

References

Stetson
Stetson Hatters football seasons
Stetson Hatters football